The Larkana–Jacobabad Light Railway was one of several branch lines in Pakistan, operated and maintained by Pakistan Railways. The line began at Larkana Junction and ended at Jacobabad Junction.

History
The Larkana–Jacobabad Light Railway (also known as the Sind Light Railway and Sindh Right Bank Feeder Railway) opened originally in 1924 as a  narrow gauge line by the North Western State Railway. From Larkana, the line extended west towards Shahdadkot then curved northeast towards Jacobabad. It followed the protective embankment of the Sindh Right Bank.

Conversion to broad gauge and closure
In 1956, the Larkana-Shadadkot section was converted by the Pakistan Western Railway into  broad gauge line. The section from Silra Shadadkot to Budapur was dismantled.

Stations
 Larkana Junction
 Bero Chandia
 Pir Muhammad Metlo Halt
 Kambar
 Bahram Hathiun
 Shahdadkot
 Silra Shahdadkot
 Bhurgari
 Garhi Khairo
 Usta Muhammad
 Jacobabad Junction

References

External links
L/AG/46/34/1  “Copies of agreements with the Secretary of State, including those relating to the following lines worked by the (North Western State Railway) Company, 1893-1924: Larkana-Jacobabad (Sind) Light Railway .......; 1893-1924”
L/F/8/20/1700  “Larkana-Jacobabad (Sind) Light Railway Limited, Contract for the construction maintenance and working of a railway; 1924”

Closed railway lines in Pakistan
Railway stations on Larkana–Jacobabad line
2 ft 6 in gauge railways in Pakistan
Railway lines opened in 1924
Railway lines closed in 2005